Bonvar or Benvar may refer to:
 Benvar, Lali
 Benvar, Shadegan
 Benvar-e Kuchek
 Benvar-e Olya
 Benvar-e Sofla
 Benvar-e Vosta
 Bonvar Hoseyn
 Bonvar-e Nazer
 Bonvar-e Shami
 Bonvar-e Yaqub

See also
 Benivar (disambiguation)